Pastilla (also called North African pie) is a North African meat or seafood pie made with warqa dough, which is similar to filo. It is a specialty of Morocco and Algeria. It has more recently been spread by emigrants to France, Israel, and North America.

History 
The name of the pie comes from the Spanish word pastilla, meaning in modern Spanish either "pill" or "small pastry" after the transformation of the phoneme "p" into "b" that is specific to the Arabic language. The historian Anny Gaul attests to recipes that bear "a strong resemblance to the stuffing that goes inside modern-day bastila" in 13th century Andalusi cookbooks, such as Ibn Razīn al-Tujībī's  . This recipe, in Gaul's words, calls for "cooking pigeon with cinnamon, almonds, saffron, onion, and eggs, as well as a double-cooking process similar to today's conventional recipe, by which the ingredients are first cooked in a pot and then finished in the oven."

The historian Idriss Bouhlila lists the dish as one of the Ottoman Algerian foods that affected Tetuani cuisine as a result of an Algerian migration to Tetuan in the aftermath of the French invasion of Algiers in 1830, while acknowledging those who consider the dish to be of Andalusi origin. Bouhlila's study corroborated Gaul's theory that the name of the dish—which according to Bouhlila is of Turkish origin—as well as the werqa pastry used to make it, arrived with the Algerian migrants to Tetuan, and spread from there to the rest of Morocco sometime after 1830.

According to Ken Albala, the basic concept of pastilla was likely brought to Morocco by Moorish Muslims who left Spain in the 16th century, or perhaps earlier, because there had been considerable traffic between Morocco and Spain since the Moors conquered the latter in the seventh century.

According to historian of Jewish food, Gil Marks, pastilla origin is from Morocco and was brought by sephardi Jews and, after the Ottoman version of "phyllo" called "warqa", reached the Maghreb, cooks substituted it for Spanish pastry. Sepharadi continued to pronounce the name with "p", while Arabic speakers substituted a "b" (bastila).

In Morocco, pastilla is generally served as a starter at the beginning of special meals, and in one of two forms: one with poultry and one with seafood. In Algeria, pastilla is usually made with chicken or with pigeon.

Poultry pastilla

Poultry pastilla was traditionally made of squab (fledgling pigeons), but shredded chicken is more often used today. It combines sweet and salty flavours; crisp layers of the crêpe-like werqa dough, savory meat slow-cooked in broth and spices and then shredded, and a crunchy layer of toasted and ground almonds, cinnamon, and sugar. The filling is made by browning the poultry in butter. Chopped onions, water, parsley, and various spices including saffron are added and the meat is simmered until tender. When cool, the meat is boned and the flesh  shredded. The liquid is reduced and thickened with eggs to form a custard-like sauce. Meat and custard are often prepared the day ahead.

Blanched almonds are fried in oil, then crushed finely and mixed with powdered sugar and cinnamon. In a round baking pan, several pieces of the thin werqa or filo dough are layered, each brushed with melted butter, and overhanging the edge of the pan. The cook adds the egg mixture, places another buttered sheet of dough over it, adds the shredded meat, also covered with a sheet of dough, and then the almond mixture is added. The overlapping pieces of dough are folded over the filling, and another 2 pieces of buttered dough are added and tucked in around the edges of the pie. The pie is baked until heated through, and the layers of dough are brown. Powdered sugar and cinnamon are sprinkled over the top before serving hot.

Seafood pastilla 

Seafood pastilla usually contains fish and other seafood, in addition to vermicelli. Unlike poultry pastilla, seafood pastilla is not sweet, but spicy.

Whereas poultry pastilla is dusted with powdered sugar and cinnamon, seafood pastilla is usually dressed with a light sprinkle of shredded cheese and a few slices of lemon. This version of pastilla is often served at Moroccan weddings.

Pastilla with milk
In the traditional Fassi cuisine, pastilla can also be served as a dessert, in which case, the pastilla is called Jowhara (jewel) or "Pastilla with milk". This pastilla is also made of warka and a milky cream put between the sheets. The Jowhara is flavored with orange flower water and decorated with cinnamon and sugar.

Sephardic Jewish version

Among Moroccan Jews, pastilla is made with olive oil or margarine rather than butter to follow kosher rules against eating dairy products and meat at the same time.

An increasingly popular variant makes individual pastries rather than large pies.

See also

 Moroccan cuisine
 Algerian cuisine
 List of Moroccan dishes
 List of Middle Eastern dishes
 List of pies, tarts and flans
 Andalusian cuisine
 Sephardic Jewish cuisine
 Berber cuisine
 Pigeon pie

References

Footnotes

Citations

Savoury pies
Moroccan cuisine
Mediterranean cuisine
Sephardi Jewish cuisine
North African cuisine
Chicken dishes
Fish dishes
Maghrebi cuisine
Middle Eastern cuisine
Berber cuisine
Jewish cuisine
Algerian cuisine